Lt-Colonel Sir Douglas Leslie Spencer Spencer-Nairn, 2nd Baronet (24 February 1906 – 8 November 1970) was a British Unionist politician in Scotland.

Spencer-Nairn was educated at Shrewsbury and Trinity Hall, Cambridge. In 1955, he was elected Member of Parliament for Central Ayrshire, defeating the Labour incumbent Archie Manuel.  Spencer-Nairn held the seat until 1959, when it was regained by Manuel against the national trend.

He was the grandfather of Canadian actress Tara Spencer-Nairn through his younger son John Chaloner Spencer-Nairn.

References

1906 births
1970 deaths
Spencer-Nairn, Sir Douglas, 2nd Baronet
Members of the Parliament of the United Kingdom for Scottish constituencies
Unionist Party (Scotland) MPs
UK MPs 1955–1959
Black Watch officers